The name Fantasy Focus may refer to these radio programs:

 Fantasy Focus (ESPN Radio program)
 Fantasy Focus (XM radio program)